Malamba is a settlement in Kenya's Coast Province

References 

Populated places in Coast Province